Three Lakes Junior/Senior High School, is a public junior and senior high school for grades 7–12. The school also contains an elementary school for K–6. There are approximately 250–280 students in the student body. The principal is Gene Welheofer and the district administrator is Teri Maney.  The mission statement of the school is "Teaching students to be productive citizens".

Extracurriculars
Three Lakes offers a variety of different extra curricular activities, from sports to arts to sciences. 
There are a number of different sports that students can participate in, which include:

 Football (Fall)
 Cross Country - Coed (Fall)
 Soccer - Boys (Fall)
 Volleyball - Girls (Fall)
 Basketball - Boys (Winter)
 Basketball - Girls (Winter)
 Wrestling - Coed (Winter)
 Baseball (Spring)
 Softball (Spring)
 Golf - Coed (Spring)
 Track and Field - Coed (Spring)
 Soccer - Girls (Spring)

Students who choose not to partake in the athletic activities choose to be sports managers, or get involved in other extracurriculars such as concert band, choir, forensic speechreading, drama, trap shooting, arts, or sciences.

Band & Choir typically have 3-4 concerts per year, and offer many instrumental options in band. Three Lakes School usually hosts the district's WSMA Large Group Festival each year, which is a large music festival in which all of the schools in the District prepare pieces and perform for individual benefit for different judges. They are then individually scored and placed at a 1st, 2nd, or 3rd, based on performance. Three Lakes also is very active in Solo & Ensemble, where students can prepares pieces alone, or as duets or groups. They then perform at the district level first, then may advance to the state level based on the judges scores.

The drama department usually holds 1-3 performances per year, or one each semester. The performances can range from plays to musicals, some being well known, like The Princess Bride and Alice in Wonderland, and some smaller productions such as Stranded. Forensics is another activity many students enjoy and partake in, which deals with speeches, story telling, and public speaking. Trap shooting is a fairly new team that many Northwoods students enjoy which is competitive.

FAB Lab
One of the newest additions to the school. Fabrication Laboratories (Fab Lab) come from the Massachusetts Institute of Technology (MIT), the Center for Bits and Atoms (CBA).  MIT's Center for Bits and Atoms is an interdisciplinary initiative exploring the boundary between computer science and physical science. CBA studies how to turn data into things, and things into data.

A Fab Lab consists of off-the-shelf, industrial-grade fabrication and electronics tools, wrapped in open source software and programs written by researchers at MIT's Center for Bits & Atoms. The Fab Lab suite of equipment supports design and fabrication activities.  2D and 3D software as well as micro scribes and scanners support the design portion of the project.  To support the fabrication portion of the project vinyl cutters, laser engravers, 3D printers, mini-mills, CNC routers and plasma cutters.  A video teleconferencing unit supports distance collaboration between labs. Students use all of these new, exciting, and different tools in learning to create new things and bring to life new ideas. TLHS Fab Lab Faculty include Mr. Mike Gorney, Mr. Brad Volkmann, and Mr. Al Votis.

Notable alumni

References

External links
Official School Website
Fab Lab Website
Fab Lab Debut in Three Lakes
Official FabCentral Site

Schools in Oneida County, Wisconsin
Public high schools in Wisconsin